This is a list of candidates of the 1915 South Australian state election.

Retiring MPs

Liberal Union

 Oscar Duhst (Wooroora) – lost preselection
 Percy Heggaton (Alexandra) – retired
 Robert Homburg (Burra Burra) – retired
 Frederick William Young (Wooroora) – appointed Agent General in London

House of Assembly
Sitting members are shown in bold text. Successful candidates are marked with an asterisk.

Legislative Council

Only two Legislative Council seats were up for election at the 1915 general election: one in each of Central District No. 1 and No. 2.

Sitting members are shown in bold text. Successful candidates are marked with an asterisk.

References

1915 elections in Australia
Candidates for South Australian state elections
1910s in South Australia